Dayana Lisset Rodríguez León (born 20 October 2001) is a Venezuelan professional footballer who plays as a midfielder for Brazilian Série A1 side Atlético Mineiro and the Venezuela women's national team.

International career
Rodríguez represented Venezuela at the 2016 South American U-17 Women's Championship and the 2016 FIFA U-17 Women's World Cup. At senior level, she played the 2018 Central American and Caribbean Games.

References

2001 births
Living people
Venezuelan women's footballers
Women's association football midfielders
Estudiantes de Caracas players
Clube Atlético Mineiro (women) players
Campeonato Brasileiro de Futebol Feminino Série A1 players
Venezuela women's international footballers
Venezuelan expatriate women's footballers
Venezuelan expatriate sportspeople in Brazil
Expatriate women's footballers in Brazil
21st-century Venezuelan women